The Moodna Viaduct is a steel railroad trestle spanning Moodna Creek and its valley at the north end of Schunemunk Mountain in Cornwall, New York, near the hamlet of Salisbury Mills.

Significance
The bridge was constructed between 1906 and 1909 by the Erie Railroad as part of its Graham Line freight bypass, and was opened for service in January 1909. Apart from the valley below, the viaduct crosses two roads (Otterkill Rd. and Orrs Mills Rd.), the Moodna Creek, and the Erie Railroad's now-abandoned Newburgh Branch. The open design of the trestle was used to reduce wind resistance and is a major reason why the trestle is still in service today.

Current use
The viaduct carries Metro-North's Port Jervis commuter line and Norfolk Southern freight trains. The Metro-North Salisbury Mills–Cornwall station sits near the north end of the viaduct. In summer 2007, timber replacement on the viaduct caused delays on the line due to slow orders placed on it, and required that service be halted during weekend days. Repairs were made to several of the concrete piers in October 2009, but traffic remained uninterrupted.

It is also a tourist attraction for the small town of Salisbury Mills. Two major roads cross under it, the major one is Orange County Route 94. The viaduct creates a spectacular landscape when viewed from the corner of Orrs Mills Road and Jackson Avenue outside of town, frequently photographed during fall foliage season.

The Moodna Viaduct appears as a prominent feature in the 2007 film Michael Clayton and in the 2020 film The Half of It.

Gallery

See also
List of bridges documented by the Historic American Engineering Record in New York (state)
List of Erie Railroad structures documented by the Historic American Engineering Record

References

External links

. Video taken from a train crossing the viaduct.
. Video taken August 2007 showing the span.
. Drone footage of the Moodna Viaduct.

Railroad bridges in New York (state)
Tourist attractions in Orange County, New York
Cornwall, New York
Bridges completed in 1909
Erie Railroad bridges
Historic American Engineering Record in New York (state)
Metro-North Railroad
Norfolk Southern Railway bridges
Trestle bridges in the United States
Iron bridges in the United States
Bridges in Orange County, New York